José Ignacio Gabilondo Pujol (born 19 October 1942, in San Sebastián) better known as Iñaki Gabilondo is a Spanish journalist, and TV news anchor.

Gabilondo started his career at 21 (1963) in Radio Popular (COPE) until 1969, when he became the director of Radio San Sebastián (Cadena SER). Two years later, he directed the news department of Cadena SER Sevilla.

In 1978 he directed and hosted Hora 25 (Cadena SER), until he became the TV news director of Televisión Española, the Spanish public TV channel network. His first night in front of the cameras was during Antonio Tejero's coup d'etat, on 23 February 1981. After he left Televisión Española, he directed Radio Televisión 16 for a short time, before coming back to Cadena SER, where he hosted Aquí la SER, Matinal SER, Pido la palabra and Onda Media. On 22 September 1986, he started hosting Hoy por hoy, the main radio show in Spain. He is Ángel Gabilondo’s brother

After almost 20 years of success, he left Cadena SER to host the news show Noticias Cuatro 2 at Cuatro, the TV channel from Sogecable. He stayed there for four years, and in February 2010 moved to CNN+ (Sogecable and Turner's Spanish news channel) to present a news and debate program called Hoy ("Today").

References

1942 births
Living people
Basque journalists
People from San Sebastián
Spanish journalists
Spanish television presenters
University of Navarra alumni